I Kill People is the second album by Canadian comedy musician Jon Lajoie.

Track listing

Videos
Many of the tracks from this album have been released on YouTube as videos.

Chart positions

References

2010 albums
Jon Lajoie albums
2010s comedy albums